Petralia may refer to:
 Petralia Soprana, municipality in Sicily
 Petralia Sottana, municipality in Sicily
 Petralia (bryozoan), a genus of bryozoans in the family Petraliidae
 Petralia (surname)